In electronics and semiconductor physics, the law of mass action is a relation about the concentrations of free electrons and electron holes under thermal equilibrium.  It states that, under thermal equilibrium, the product of the free electron concentration  and the free hole concentration  is equal to a constant square of intrinsic carrier concentration . The intrinsic carrier concentration is a function of temperature.

The equation for the mass action law for semiconductors is:

Carrier concentrations
In semiconductors, free electrons and holes are the carriers that provide conduction. For cases where the number of carriers are much less than the number of band states, the carrier concentrations can be approximated by using Boltzmann statistics, giving the results below.

Electron concentration
The free-electron concentration n can be approximated by

where 
 Ec is the energy of the conduction band,
 EF is the energy of the Fermi level,
 kB is the Boltzmann constant,
 T is the absolute temperature in kelvins,

Hole concentration
The free-hole concentration p is given by a similar formula

where 
 EF is the energy of the Fermi level,
 Ev is the energy of the valence band,
 kB is the Boltzmann constant,
 T is the absolute temperature in kelvins,

Mass action law
Using the carrier concentration equations given above, the mass action law can be stated as

where Eg is the band gap energy given by Eg = Ec − Ev. The above equation holds true even for lightly doped extrinsic semiconductors as the product  is independent of doping concentration.

See also
 Law of mass action

References

External links
  Doping, Carrier Concentration, Mobility, and Conductivity
 Semi-conductor tutorial

Electronic engineering
Empirical laws